Ranunculus macrophyllus is a species of plants in the family Ranunculaceae.

Sources

References 

macrophyllus
Flora of Malta